The 2001 Villanova Wildcats football team represented the Villanova University during the 2001 NCAA Division I-AA football season. The Wildcats were led by 17th-year head coach Andy Talley played their home games at Villanova Stadium in Villanova, Pennsylvania.

Schedule

References

Villanova
Villanova Wildcats football seasons
Atlantic 10 Conference football champion seasons
Villanova Wildcats football